Lesnoye is a rural locality (a village) in Skvorchikhinsky Selsoviet, Ishimbaysky District, Bashkortostan, Russia. The population was 11 as of 2010. There is 1 street.

Geography 
Lesnoye is located 25 km southeast of Ishimbay (the district's administrative centre) by road. Torgaska is the nearest rural locality.

References 

Rural localities in Ishimbaysky District